Sirhind railway station is located in Fatehgarh Sahib district in the Indian state of Punjab and serves  Sirhind & Fatehgarh Sahib. Sirhind Junction is situated on Attari-Delhi line and connect Sirhind Una line.Sirhind railways station comes under Northern Railway zone in Ambala railway division.

The railway station

History
The Scinde, Punjab & Delhi Railway completed  the -long Amritsar–Ambala–Saharanpur–Ghaziabad line in 1870 connecting Multan (now in Pakistan) with Delhi.

The Sirhind–Nangal line was opened in 1927.

Electrification
The Shahbad Markanda-Mandi Gobindgarh sector was electrified in 1995–96.

References

External links
 Trains at Sirhind

Railway stations in Fatehgarh Sahib district
Ambala railway division